Perfluoromethylcyclohexane is a fluorocarbon liquid—a perfluorinated derivative of the hydrocarbon methylcyclohexane. It is chemically and biologically inert.

Manufacture
Perfluoromethylcyclohexane can be manufactured by the Fowler process, which involves moderating the action of elemental fluorine with cobalt fluoride in the gas phase from toluene. This is preferred as the starting material over methylcyclohexane as less fluorine is required.

Properties
Perfluoromethylcyclohexane is chemically inert and thermally stable (to over 400 °C). It is non-toxic.

It is a clear, colorless liquid, with a relatively high density, low viscosity and low surface tension that will rapidly evaporate. It is a relatively good solvent for gases, but a poor solvent for solids and liquids.

In common with other cyclic perfluorocarbons, perfluoromethylcyclohexane can be detected at extremely low concentrations, making it ideal as a tracer.

Applications
 Heat transfer agent
 Dielectric fluid
 Perfluorocarbon tracer

References 

Fluorocarbons
Halogenated solvents
Coolants